Magdalene Visaggio (born September 22, 1984) is an American comic book writer. Visaggio is known for her work on Kim & Kim and Vagrant Queen. Her comics have been nominated for two Eisner Awards and three GLAAD Media Awards. Her comic series Vagrant Queen was adapted into a television series which ran for a single season on Syfy in 2020.

Personal life
Visaggio was born in 1984 on Long Island and grew up in Richmond, Virginia. She attended Virginia Commonwealth University and Seton Hall University. She has stated that she has autism. Her favorite television shows growing up were the animated X-Men, Sailor Moon, and FLCL. Visaggio said that she would like to write comics of Silver Surfer, Spider-Girl, or Doom Patrol. Visaggio is a trans woman. She is also a member of the Democratic Socialists of America.

Career
Visaggio first published work was in 2006 as writer and co-creator of Sanctuary a self published series with Martin Krause and Kevin Roberts. The first three issues of the series were subsequently rewritten by Visaggio before being renamed Stronghold in 2014 with a collected edition of the first three issues and the series continuing on under the new moniker from #4. In 2015 Visaggio successfully used Kickstarter to publish the first issue of Andrew Jackson in Space. From 2016, Visaggio contributed a number of articles on comic books to Paste.

Visaggio came to wider prominence in the comic book industry with the limited series Kim & Kim from Black Mask Studios. The series was nominated for the 2017 Eisner Award for Best Limited Series and GLAAD Media Award for Outstanding Comic Book. The success led to Visaggio signing a three-book deal with Black Mask Studios for her next three projects: Quantum Teens Are Go, Kim & Kim: Love is a Battlefield and Sex Death Revolution.

In 2017, she was chosen to take part in DC Comics Writer Workshop program, studying under Scott Snyder. Her first published work for DC was for the Young Animal Imprint where she wrote several backup features and the limited series Eternity Girl. From her time in the Writers Workshop, short-stories by Visaggio were featured in the one-shots DC Cursed Comics Cavalcade and DC New Talent Showcase 2018.
 
In 2018, her graphic novel The Ojja-Wojja: A Teen Horror Mystery or Whatever, You Know? was bought by HarperCollins imprint Balzer + Bray in a two book deal, with the first book due out in Spring 2021. 2018 also saw the debut of Vagrant Queen from publisher Vault Comics. In 2020, a television series adaptation of Vagrant Queen aired on SyFy (co-produced by Blue Ice Pictures), but, after a single ten-episode season, the series was cancelled due to low ratings. In comics, 2019 saw Visaggio co-write Strangelands with Darcie Little Badger for Humanoids Imprint H1. It also saw her publish her first work with Valiant Comics with a new volume of Doctor Mirage.

In 2020, Visaggio launched a second volume of Vagrant Queen at Vault Comics and her second series at ComiXology; Lost on Planet Earth.

Awards and nominations
2017 Eisner Award for Best Limited Series – Kim & Kim (nominated)
2017 GLAAD Media Award for Outstanding Comic Book – Kim & Kim (nominated)
2018 GLAAD Media Award for Outstanding Comic Book – Quantum Teens Are Go (nominated)
2019 GLAAD Media Award for Outstanding Comic Book – Oh S#!t It's Kim & Kim (nominated)
2019 Eisner Award for Best Limited Series – Eternity Girl (nominated)

Bibliography

Archie Comics
Chilling Adventures Presents: Jinx's Grim Fairy Tales #1 (Framing sequence and The True Story of Kevnetella only, 2022)
Black Mask Studios
Kim & Kim #1–4 (2016)
Quantum Teens Are Go #1–4 (2017)
Kim & Kim: Love is a Battlefield #1–4 (2017)
Oh S#!t It's Kim & Kim #1–5 (2018)
Sex Death Revolution #1–5 (2018–2019, #4 & #5 were published digitally only)
Boom! Studios
Mighty Morphin Power Rangers Anniversary Special #1 (Udonna Story only, 2018)
ComiXology Originals
Teenage Wasteland #1-3 (2018–2019)
Lost on Planet Earth #1-5 (2020)
Darkhorse Comics
Calamity Kate #1–4 (2019)
Cold Bodies Graphic Novel (2022)
DC Comics
Shade the Changing Girl #4 (Element Girl Backup only, 2017)
JLA/Doom Patrol Special #1 (Eternity Girl Backup only, 2018)
Mother Panic/Batman Special #1 (Eternity Girl Backup only, 2018)
Shade the Changing Girl/Wonder Woman Special #1  (Eternity Girl Backup only, 2018)
Cave Carson Has a Cybernetic Eye/Swamp Thing Special #1  (Eternity Girl Backup only, 2018)
Eternity Girl #1–6 (2018)
Cursed Comics Cavalcade #1 (Superman Story only, 2018)
New Talent Showcase 2018 #1 (Wonder Woman Story only, 2018)
Jinny Hex Special #1 (2020)
Dark Nights Death Metal: The Last 52 War of the Multiverse #1 (Superman Story only, 2020)
Humanoids
Strangelands #1-8 (Co-writer with Darcie Little Badger, 2019–2020)
IDW
Transformers vs. The Visionaries #1–5 (2018)
Marilyn Manor #1 (2019)
Marvel Comics
Secret Empire: Brave New World #3 (Starbrand story Only, 2017)
Edge of Venomverse: War Stories #1 (2017)
Dazzler: X-Song #1 (2018)
Magnificent Ms. Marvel Annual #1 (2019)
Oni Press
Rick and Morty #31, 33–35, 51, 53–55 (Backup only: "The Rick Identity", 2017–2019)
Rick and Morty Presents: Sleepy Gary #1 (2018)
Morning in America #1–5 (2019)
Rick and Morty: Infinity Hour #1–4 (2022)
Redline Comics
Sanctuary #1–3 (2006-2013, issues rewritten and published as Stronghold Vol. 1: The Chains in 2014) (as Brian Visaggio)
Stronghold #4–7 (2014–2017) (as Brian Visaggio)
Andrew Jackson in Space #1 (2015) (as Brian Visaggio)
Valiant Entertainment
Doctor Mirage #1–5 (2019)
Vault Comics
Vagrant Queen #1–6 (2018–2019)
Vagrant Queen: A Planet Called Doom #1–6 (2020-2021)

References

External links
 Magdalene Visaggio on Twitter
 

1984 births
Living people
American comics writers
LGBT comics creators
Transgender women
LGBT people from New York (state)
LGBT people from Virginia
Members of the Democratic Socialists of America
Writers from Richmond, Virginia
American women writers
American writers of Italian descent
American transgender writers